The 1960 West Virginia Mountaineers football team represented West Virginia University as a member of the Southern Conference (SoCon) during the 1960 NCAA University Division football season. Led by first-year head coach Gene Corum, the Mountaineers compiled an overall record of 0–8–2 with a mark of 0–2–1 in conference play, placing last out of nine teams in the SoCon.

Schedule

Roster

References

West Virginia
West Virginia Mountaineers football seasons
College football winless seasons
West Virginia Mountaineers football